The third competition weekend of the 2015–16 ISU Speed Skating World Cup was held in Eisstadion Inzell in Inzell, Germany, from Friday, 4 December, until Sunday, 6 December 2015.

There were no world records over the weekend. Multiple winners were Lee Sang-hwa of South Korea, who won both women's 500 m races, and Brittany Bowe of the United States, who won the women's 1000 and 1500 m races.

Schedule
The detailed schedule of events:

All times are CET (UTC+1).

Medal summary

Men's events

 In mass start, race points are accumulated during the race. The skater with most race points is the winner.

Women's events

 In mass start, race points are accumulated during the race. The skater with most race points is the winner.

Standings
The top ten standings in the contested cups after the weekend. The top five nations in the team pursuit cups.

Men's cups

500 m

1000 m

1500 m

5k/10k

Mass start

Team pursuit

Grand World Cup

Women's cups

500 m

1000 m

1500 m

3k/5k

Mass start

Team pursuit

Grand World Cup

References

 
3
Isu World Cup, 2015-16, 3
Sports competitions in Bavaria